Them: Adventures with Extremists is a book by British journalist Jon Ronson published in 2001.

The book accompanied Ronson's documentary series The Secret Rulers of the World, which covered similar topics and depicted many of the same episodes. Both the series and book detail Ronson's encounters following theorists and activists residing on the fringes of the political, religious, and sociological spectrum.

Plot
Ronson chronicles his travels and interviews with "extremists" and attempts to uncover the mystery behind the "tiny elite that rules the world from inside a secret room". The book is written on the premise that perhaps extremists are not all that crazy, and as different as they may seem to be, they have a lot in common with each other (specifically the belief that a small group of very prominent people controls the fate of the entire world). From Omar Bakri Muhammad ("Osama bin Laden's man in Great Britain") to Thomas Robb (Grand Wizard of the Knights of the Ku Klux Klan), Ronson exposes the hilarity and absurdity of their missions, but also, at times, their startling sanity.

His adventures lead him from Britain to Ruby Ridge, Idaho, to Waco, Texas, to Portugal.

Alongside subjects covered in The Secret Rulers of the World, Ronson also describes encounters with radical Islamic activist Omar Bakri Muhammad, Ku Klux Klan leader Thomas Robb, Northern Irish politician Ian Paisley and film director Tony Kaye. Omar Bakri Muhammad, Thom Robb, and Ian Paisley were the subjects of the earlier Ronson documentaries, Tottenham Ayatollah, New Klan, and Dr. Paisley, I Presume.

Much of this book is dedicated to the meeting places of the Bilderberg Group.

References

External links
 Booknotes interview with Ronson on Them, March 24, 2002.

2001 non-fiction books
Political books
Religious studies books
2001 in religion
Books about conspiracy theories
Books by Jon Ronson
Books about the Ku Klux Klan